Yashnobod is one of 12 districts (tuman) of Tashkent, the capital of Uzbekistan.

Overview
The district was established in 1968 with name Khamza district. It is an eastern district, and borders with the tuman of Mirzo Ulugbek, Yunusabad, Mirobod and Bektemir, as well as with Tashkent Province.

Transportation 
Out of 365 streets, the main ones are Istiklol Street, Taraqqiyot Street, Fargona Yuli Street, Tashkent Ring Road, Zharkurgan Street, Yashnobod and Akhangaran Highway.

The district has the Uzbekistan line metro station Mashinasozlar and Do‘stlik, which is the largest freight railway station in Tashkent (Product code 722400).

In the end of August 2014, the district was renamed to Yashnobod.

Education
Yashnobod district hosts a number of institutions of higher education, including the first entrepreneurial university in Uzbekistan - TEAM University, and Tashkent State Stomatological Institute.

References

External links

Districts of Tashkent
Populated places established in 1981
1981 establishments in the Soviet Union